Yevgeni Viktorovich Polyakov (born 29 September 1980) is a Russian professional football manager and a former player.

Club career
He played in the Russian Football National League for FC Avangard Kursk in 2005.

Honours
 Russian Second Division Zone Centre top scorer: 2010 (20 goals).

External links
 

1980 births
Living people
Russian footballers
Association football forwards
FC Oryol players
FC Lukhovitsy players
FC Lada-Tolyatti players
FC Avangard Kursk players
FK Atlantas players
FC Shakhter Karagandy players
A Lyga players
Kazakhstan Premier League players
Russian expatriate footballers
Expatriate footballers in Lithuania
Expatriate footballers in Kazakhstan
Russian expatriate sportspeople in Kazakhstan
Russian football managers